A throat lozenge (also known as a cough drop, sore throat sweet, troche, cachou, pastille or cough sweet) is a small, typically medicated tablet intended to be dissolved slowly in the mouth to temporarily stop coughs, lubricate, and soothe irritated tissues of the throat (usually due to a sore throat or strep throat), possibly from the common cold or influenza. Cough tablets have taken the name lozenge, based on their original shape, a diamond.

Ingredients
Lozenges may contain benzocaine, an anaesthetic, or eucalyptus oil.  Non-menthol throat lozenges generally use either zinc gluconate glycine or pectin as an oral demulcent. Several brands of throat lozenges contain dextromethorphan.

Other varieties such as Halls contain menthol, peppermint oil and/or spearmint as their active ingredient(s). Honey lozenges are also available. 

The purpose of the throat lozenge is to calm the irritation that may be felt in the throat while swallowing, breathing, or even drinking certain fluids. However, one study found that excessive use of menthol cough drops can prolong coughs rather than relieve them.

History

Candies to soothe the throat date back to 1000 BC in Egypt's Twentieth Dynasty, when they were made from honey flavored with citrus, herbs, and spices. In the 19th century, physicians discovered morphine and heroin, which suppress coughing at its source—the brain.  Popular formulations of that era included Smith Brothers Cough Drops, first advertised in 1852, and Luden's, created in 1879. Concern over the risk of opioid dependence led to the development of alternative medications.

Brands

Cēpacol
Chloraseptic
Fisherman's Friend
Halls
Läkerol
Lockets
Luden's
Negro
Pine Bros.
Ricola
Robitussin
Smith Brothers
Strepsils
Sucrets
Ülker
Throzz
 Troketts
Tunes
Tyrozets (now discontinued)
Vicks
 Strep-Drops
Victory V
Vigroids
 Zubes (now discontinued)

See also
Pastille
Mint (candy)

References

External links
 Ingredients of a throat lozenge, Health Canada

 
Drug delivery devices
Dosage forms